André Quitich (born 1951) is an Atikamekw politician and administrator. He served as Grand Chief and President of the  Atikamekw Nation from 2013 until 2014.

Early life and educational career
Quitich was born in Manawan, Quebec, Canada. Over the course of 40 years, he worked for Otapi High School. He served as General Manager and Director of Administrative Services and Finance.

Political career
From 2004 to 2007, he served as Deputy Negotiator in the Indigenous comprehensive claims. On August 27, 2013, he was elected Grand Chief and Chairman of the Atikamekw Nation. He seceded Eve Ottawa.

As Grand Chief and Chairman, he played a key role in the comprehensive claims, helping the tribe acquire over 80,000 kilometers of territory in Nitaskinan.

References

1951 births
Atikamekw people
Indigenous leaders in Quebec
People from Lanaudière
Living people